Brotia episcopalis is a species of freshwater snail with an operculum, an aquatic gastropod mollusk in the family Pachychilidae.

Taxonomy 
In the 20th century, B. episcopalis was frequently synonymized with Brotia costula due to cryptically similar shell morphology. In the 21st century molecular data was able to distinguish this species.

Distribution 
This species occurs in:
 peninsular Malaysia
 Thailand

Human use 
Evidence of B. episcopalis being used as food has been discovered in Neolithic archaeological sites in Malaysia.

References

External links 

episcopalis
Gastropods described in 1851
Edible molluscs
Freshwater snails